

The Weiss WM-10 Ölyv (English: "Buzzard") was a 1930s Hungarian biplane trainer designed and built by the Manfred Weiss company.

Development
First flown in September 1931 the WM-10 was a single-bay two-seat primary training biplane powered by the companies own   MW Sport I engine. The prototype was later modified to take the more powerful   MW Sport II engine and an improved landing gear and eight were built as the WM-10a and delivered in 1933. The last aircraft was re-engined with a   MW Sport III engine and larger fuel tanks and re-designated the WM-13 .

Five more aircraft were built with Siemens-Halske Sh 12 engines as aerobatic trainers for use by combat units as the EM-10. In 1938 all surviving aircraft we re-engined with the Siemens engine and all were known as the WM-10. Three aircraft survived with the military to 1941 when they were retired to be used as glider tugs.

Variants
WM-10
Prototype with a   MW Sport I engine, one built.
WM-10a
Production aircraft with a   MW Sport II engine, eight built. One converted to WM-13 and survivors later re-engined with a Siemens-Halske Sh 12 engines. 
WM-13
One WM-10a re-engined with a   MW Sport III engine.
EM-10
powered by a  Siemens-Halske Sh 12 engined aerobatic trainer, five built.

Operators

Hungarian Air Force

Specifications (WM-10a)

See also

Notes

References

 

Hungarian military trainer aircraft
Weiss Manfred aircraft
Aircraft first flown in 1931
Single-engine aircraft
Biplanes